Frederick Townsend (September 21, 1825 – September 12, 1897) was a Union officer in the American Civil War. He founded and was Colonel of the 3rd New York Infantry Regiment, and later served with the US Army's 18th and 9th Infantry regiments, where he was brevetted a brigadier general. Townsend served three terms as Adjutant General of New York from 1857–1861, and again in 1880.

Early life
Frederick Townsend was born in Albany, New York on 21 September 1825 to Isaiah and Hannah Townsend. He was the grandson of Solomon Townsend, a ship's captain during the American Revolution, and great grandson of Samuel Townsend a member of the New York provincial congress and of the committee appointed to prepare a form of government for the state of New York. His ancestors Henry Townsend and Henry's brother John immigrated to Massachusetts from Norfolk England in 1640 and settled at Jamaica on Long Island NY, and were founding members of Oyster Bay Long Island.

Townsend had 7 brothers and 2 sisters. There was a strong military bent in the family, as one brother, Franklin Townsend was Adjutant General of New York from 1869–1873, and another, Robert served in the U.S. Navy, both on the side of the Union. His sister Mary, on the other hand, married General William H.T. Walker of the Confederate Army.

Frederick attended The Albany Academy and Bartlett Collegiate School at Poughkeepsie, New York and was graduated from Union College, which he entered at age 15, in 1844. He studied law under John V. L. Pruyn and was admitted to the bar in 1849 and practiced in Albany.

That year gold was discovered in California. Townsend was equipped by his grandmother with equipment and an aide to seek his fortune on the Pacific coast. After being given up for dead following a long period of no news, Frederick returned to Albany with tales of being captured by Indians and surviving a tornado. He also carried a single nugget of the precious metal which he gave his grandmother who preserved it as a family treasure.

Military career
Returning home he was made captain of Company B of the Washington Continentals of Albany. He organized the 76th regiment of militia of which he was colonel, and later on the Albany Zouave cadets.

He was appointed by Governor John Alsop King in 1857 Adjutant general of the state of New York, leading Townsend to end his law practice. Finding the militia to be less than it should be, he significantly reordered it. He prepared an annual report to the legislature from this department for the first time. Additionally he improved the conditions of the citizen soldiers and increased their numbers to 12,000 effective men. Townsend's efforts were recognized as effective and he was reappointed by the next governor of the state, Governor Edwin D. Morgan in 1859.

In 1861 he organized the 3rd New York Volunteer Infantry Regiment of which he was commissioned colonel and which he led in the Battle of Big Bethel on June 10, 1861. Townsend's unit suffered 21 wounded from friendly fire when the 7th New York Volunteer Infantry Regiment mistook them for Confederates and opened fire. He was appointed by President Abraham Lincoln major in the 18th U.S. Infantry on August 19, 1861 and served under Generals Don Carlos Buell and William Rosecrans. Townsend took part in the Battle of Lick Creek, Mississippi, where he led the battalion in reconnaissance. On April 30 he took part in the Siege of Corinth and in the Battle of Perryville, Kentucky on October 8, 1862, which has been called one of the bloodiest of the Civil War given the number of soldiers engaged.

At the Battle of Stones River on December 31, 1862 with all the senior officers of the regular brigade having been shot except the brigade commander, Townsend was placed in command of the left wing of the brigade. The loss of his brigade in the fight was 94 killed 497 wounded and 50 missing.

He was then brevetted lieutenant colonel, colonel, and brigadier general in the regular Army. In 1863 he was posted to duty as acting assistant provost marshal general at Albany. In 1867 after a leave of absence in Europe he was made acting assistant inspector general of the department of California from which he inspected all the government posts in Arizona. He resigned his commission in 1868 and returned to Albany.

He was appointed brigadier general of 9th Brigade of the state militia in 1878 and adjutant general of the state in 1880 under Gov. Alonzo B. Cornell. As part of a commission to revise the military code in the state, Townsend undertook to restructure the state forces, resulting in a disbanding of a number of regiments, including his former command, the 9th Brigade, accompanied by a downsizing of the officer corps.  Along with the painful downsizing and restructuring of the militia, he successfully urged the adoption of a state service uniform and a state military camp, which later came to be named Camp Townsend, (now Camp Smith) in Peekskill.

Other activities

Townsend was a member of a number of military organizations including:
 The Society of the Army of the Cumberland
 The Grand Army of the Republic
 The Military Order of the Loyal Legion of the United States

He was nominated by the 1880 Republican state convention to serve as a presidential elector, and he cast his vote for James A. Garfield on 9 November 1880.

Directorships
Gen Townsend has been a director of:
 Trustee of Vassar College
 New York National Bank
 Albany & Bethlehem Turnpike Company
 Albany Orphan Asylum
 Dudley Observatory
 The Albany Academy

Family
In 1863, Townsend married Sarah Rathbone of Albany. Together they had children:
 Annie Townsend (1866–1881) died at age 15
 Frederick Townsend (1871–1949) President of Albany Savings Bank
 Sarah Rathbone Townsend (1868-1930) married Gerrit Yates Lansing

Death
Townsend died at Lake Luzerne NY on 12 September 1897, and is buried at the Albany Rural Cemetery.

References

1825 births
1897 deaths
Adjutants General of New York (state)
American militia generals
American people of English descent
Burials at Albany Rural Cemetery
Military personnel from Albany, New York
Townsend family
Union Army colonels
United States Army officers
The Albany Academy alumni